Minister for Regional Development may refer to:

 Minister for Regional Development (New South Wales), a position in the government of the Australian state of New South Wales
 Minister for Regional Development (Western Australia), a position in the government of the Australian state of Western Australia

See also
 Ministry of Regional Development (disambiguation)